Koukoulou is a town in the Kayao Department of Bazèga Province in central Burkina Faso. The town has a population of 1,803.

References

Populated places in the Centre-Sud Region
Bazèga Province